SCH-442,416 is a highly selective adenosine A2a subtype receptor antagonist. It is widely used in its 11C radiolabelled form to map the distribution of A2a receptors in the brain, where they are mainly found in the striatum, nucleus accumbens, and olfactory tubercle. Given its distribution in the brain, A2a receptors have been investigated for the treatment of various neurological disorders, and SCH-442,416 has shown promise in treatment of depression, Parkinson's disease, and catalepsy.

References

External links 
 Molecular Imaging and Contrast Agent Database: SCH-442,416

Phenol ethers
2-Furyl compounds
Adenosine receptor antagonists